The 1957–58 Football League season was Birmingham City Football Club's 55th in the Football League and their 31st in the First Division. They finished in 13th position in the 22-team division. They entered the 1957–58 FA Cup at the third round proper and lost in that round to York City. In the inaugural edition of the Inter-Cities Fairs Cup, Birmingham lost in the semi-final in a play-off, having drawn on aggregate score with Barcelona.

In February 1958, Pat Beasley joined the club. Beasley had believed he was coming as assistant to manager Arthur Turner, but chairman Harry Morris announced to the press that he was to be appointed joint manager. Turner, who found about this arrangement not from the club but from the press, threatened to resign. He was persuaded to stay "for the time being", but finally left early in the 1958–59 season.

Twenty-four players made at least one appearance in nationally or internationally organised first-team competition, and there were twelve different goalscorers. Half back Dick Neal played in 44 of the 46 first-team matches over the season, and Peter Murphy finished as leading goalscorer with 23 goals in all competitions, of which 20 were scored in the league.

Football League First Division

League table (part)

FA Cup

Inter-Cities Fairs Cup

The group stage of the inaugural edition of the Inter-Cities Fairs Cup was completed during the 1956–57 playing season. The score at half time in the first leg of the semi-final, at St Andrew's, was 3–3, and Peter Murphy scored the winner after an hour. In the away leg, in the recently opened Camp Nou, El Mundo Deportivo expected a comfortable victory for the hosts, but the result was rather less clear-cut. The only goal of the game was scored after 82 minutes by Kubala, who saw Gil Merrick off his line and neatly lobbed him. With no away goals rule, the game went into 30 minutes of extra time, which remained goalless, so a replay was to be played on a neutral ground. Controversy arose when Birmingham were prevented from substituting the injured Bunny Larkin, contrary to what they believed had been agreed before the match; Barcelona manager Domènec Balmanya claimed the agreement allowed for two substitutes, but outfield players could only be replaced in the first half. Asked what he thought of Barcelona, Birmingham trainer Dave Fairhurst said he thought they played better in the first leg, where they concentrated on playing; here, they spent too much time complaining. Balmanya's opinion of Birmingham had not changed since the first leg: he saw them as a physical team with crude technique, too concerned with the opponent to think much about the ball.

El Mundo Deportivo was more complimentary about Birmingham's style of play in the replay. While they had come to Barcelona to avoid losing, and nearly succeeded, they went to St. Jakob-Park, in Basel, Switzerland, to win, and to be worthy of the victory. It also suggested that the playing surface – rough, and covered with long wet grass – was better suited to an open, long-ball game than to precise passing and close marking. Barcelona scored first through Evaristo, Murphy equalised early in the second half, then with seven minutes left, Suárez picked up the ball in midfield and passed to Kubala who drew Merrick out of his goal and gave him no chance with his shot.

Appearances and goals

Players with name struck through and marked  left the club during the playing season.

See also
Birmingham City F.C. seasons

References
General
 
 
 Source for match dates and results: 
 Source for lineups, appearances, goalscorers and attendances: Matthews (2010), Complete Record, pp. 350–51, 473.
 Source for kit: "Birmingham City". Historical Football Kits. Retrieved 22 May 2018.

Specific

Birmingham City F.C. seasons
Birmingham City